The 27 bataillon de chasseurs alpins (27 BCA) is a Chasseurs alpins battalion of the French Army. It is a heavily decorated unit, whose members wear the fourragère of the Legion of Honour.

Organisation 
The 27 BCA operated under the 27th Mountain Infantry Brigade, which specialises in combat in extreme conditions, both in mountain and urban zones.

The 27 BCA comprises
 6 combat companies, including one reserve intervention unit
 Support Company
 Command and Logistics Company
 Administration and Support Unit
 Fanfare du 27e Bataillon de Chasseurs Alpin

History 
The 27 BCA was created after the Franco-Prussian War. It distinguished itself during the First World War, earning 9 mentions in despatches and the fourragère of the Legion of Honour.

During the Second World War, it notably took part in the Battles of Narvik. After it was disbanded after Case Anton, some of its elements trained the Maquis des Glières; in subsequent combat against SS units the Battalion gained the motto of Vivre libre ou mourir ("live as free men, or die").

It took part in the Algerian War, in Kabily, until 1962.

Recently, the 27 BCA has been engaged in Afghanistan, notably taking part in the Battle of Alasay.

Commander

External links
 Official site of the 27th BCA
 Second Official site of the 27th BCA
 Official Facebook page the 27th BCA

Infantry battalions of France
Mountain units and formations